Andrzej Zaucha (born 1967) is a Polish journalist and writer.

Born in Zakliczyn near Tarnów, southern Poland,  Zaucha has reported as a journalist in Russia and Chechnya. Since 1997 he has been based in Moscow as a correspondent for the Polish daily "Gazeta Wyborcza", private radio station RMF FM, and television network TVN. In 2003 Zaucha published "Moscow: Nord-Ost" regarding the terrorist attack on Moscow's Dubrovka Theatre in October 2002.

References

1967 births
Living people
Polish journalists
Polish male writers